The Blick nach Rechts (BNR, View to the Right) is a social democratic German-language information service which appears every two weeks on the Internet. Its concern is the current "information about Far-right activities" (subtitle: "Aufklärung über rechtsextreme Aktivitäten"), which in the opinion of the initiators aren't noticed enough by the German media.

Structure and purchase 
Between 1984 and 2004, the journal appeared as a printed issue, and since then appears as an online-magazine every two weeks, thus with up to 26 issues per year. For one-year subscribers, these are also available as e-papers.

The articles of the most recent online-issue are usually available for free. They will be archived with the appearance of the subsequent issue.

The front-page of the BNR offers a sitemap to get to all the subpages. it is divided into for main rubrics:
"BNR aktuell" for current news, events and activities
an archive with all the issues back till 1996. The archive and the internal search function are free to use for users who are registered with their name and e-mail address and who have purchased a one-year subscription and in turn have received a password.
an "Interaktiv" page, where subscribers can read and write letters to the editor, announce projects against right-wing extremism and win their friends as readers of the BNR
an "Aktiv" page with a steadily updated calendar of activities, a list of initiatives and games against right-wing extremism
 
Among the Sub-rubrics which are attainable immediately are:
"brandaktuell" ("urgent news") with hints to daily news relevant for the field 
"Meinungen" ("opinions") with letters to the editor and comments on such events
"Hintergrund" ("Background") with background information about these
a summary of the recent issue
a rubric "Abo" ("subscription")

An internal search function allows to research every article of the archive and the recent issue for a keyword, ordered by relevance. For security reason, the result of the search will be deleted immediately again after opening a single page.

There is no public page for letters to the editor. The BNR editorial staff decides which of the signed letters they print.

Controversy 
On 28 September 2004 the CDU/CSU parliamentary group issued a Small Inquiry to the Federal Government about the support of the BNR with tax money. The inquiry criticised the "large number of links" from the homepage to "obviously extremely left movements, which are also mentioned in the reports of the Federal Office for the Protection of the Constitution". Together with ten local Antifa groups and alliances, it was listing the
 (Union of persecuted of the Nazi regime - Alliance of the Antifaschists)
and two internet-sites. For some of these groups, the Inquiry refers to opinions of the Federal offices and State offices (Landesbehörden) for the Protection of the Constitution. This substantiated the suspicion of the inquirers "that the ‘View to the Right’ is a platform for the distribution of far left slogans under the cover of the struggle against the far right".

At the time of the inquiry the imprint of the BNR-Homepage contained the note, that they don't agree with the content of other internet-sites. The objected links had already been deleted.

According to the answer of the federal government to the small inquiry, in the year 2000 the BNR was funded with collectively 56,497.75 Deutsche Mark by the Ministry of the Interior. The question of ownership did not play a role. The "concern of the ‘bnr’ to inform about current developments and the background of the extreme right-wing scene" is "worth to be supported". The Federal Government further explained: "The imprint of the ‘bnr’ states the ‘bnr’ does not agree with content from web-sites of third parties to which links from its pages are directed. Additionally, the ‘bnr’ asks their users to announce fallacious, illegal or changed content on such pages of third parties."

Editors and authors 
The current editor is the journalist Helmut Lölhöffel of the Institut für Information und Dokumentation e.V. (Institute for Information and Documentation registered association), the publisher is the Berliner Vorwärts Verlagsgesellschaft mbH, the patron is   Ute Vogt, former Minister of State and former chair member of the Social Democratic Party of Germany.

The BNR has no steady list of authors. Several politologists, journalists and experts of the field contribute as free lancers. In 2007, among them were:

Robert Andreasch
Horst Freires
Gudrun Giese
Michael Klarmann
Viktor Licht
Heiner Lichtenstein 
Eberhard Löblich
Anton Maegerle
Theo Meier-Ewert
Thomas Niehoff
Peter Nowak
Armin Pfahl-Traughber
Thomas Pfeiffer
Andrea Röpke
Tomas Sager
Bernhard Schmid
Andreas Speit
Volker Stahl

and others.

See also
Der Rechte Rand
Dokumentationsarchiv des österreichischen Widerstandes
Informationsdienst gegen Rechtsextremismus
Nizkor Project
redok

References

External links 
  
 Entry in the ZDB
(Central journal database of Germany)

1984 establishments in West Germany
2004 disestablishments in Germany
Anti-fascism in Germany
Anti-nationalism in Europe
Defunct political magazines published in Germany
Biweekly magazines published in Germany
German-language magazines
Magazines established in 1984
Magazines disestablished in 2004
Online magazines with defunct print editions
Social Democratic Party of Germany